Kalvaryja (Belarusian: Кальварыя) is a Catholic Calvary cemetery in Minsk, Belarus.

The cemetery contains a small Catholic chapel, currently used for general worship. The original wooden Catholic church was first built here back in 1673, but currently the oldest remaining graves are from 1808. The small chapel was built in 1839. Several famous Polish and Belarusian personalities from the 19th century are buried at Kalvaryja.

In 2001, the cemetery became the center of a controversy when it was revealed that the state-run company responsible for taking care of the graves was destroying old graves and selling the newly freed slots to the wealthy.

External links 

 Photos on Radzima.org
 

Cemeteries in Belarus
Catholic cemeteries in Europe
Buildings and structures in Minsk
Roman Catholic churches in Belarus
Churches completed in 1808
19th-century Roman Catholic church buildings in Belarus